In 1991, the Bangladesh Bureau of Statistics, conducted a national census in Bangladesh. They recorded data from all of the districts and upazilas and main cities in Bangladesh including statistical data on population size, households, sex and age distribution, marital status, economically active population, literacy and educational attainment, religion, number of children etc. According to the census, Hindus were 10.5 per cent of the population, down from 12.1 per cent as of 1981.

Bangladesh have a population of 106,314,992 as per 1991 census report. Majority of 93,886,769 reported that they were Muslims, 11,184,337 reported as Hindus, 616,626 as Buddhists, 350,839 as Christians and 276,418 as others.

See also 
 Demographics of Bangladesh
 2001 Census of Bangladesh
 2011 Census of Bangladesh

References

External links
 Bangladesh Bureau of Statistics, "Census Reports: Population Census-2001", 2001. The 1991 census figures can be seen compared to the 2001 census.

Censuses in Bangladesh
Bangladesh
Census